Peter Tyrrell (1916  –  26 April 1967) was an Irish author and former inmate of St Joseph's Industrial School, Letterfrack, an institution run by the Christian Brothers.

Early life

Tyrrell was born in 1916 to poor parents near Cappagh, Ahascragh, County Galway, Ireland. His mother begged to support her family, and when Peter was aged eight the authorities petitioned the courts to place him and three of his siblings into St Joseph's Industrial School, where he remained until he was 16.

Adult life
He worked as a tailor in Ballinasloe for a while, then in 1935 he emigrated and in 1939 joined the British Army. While in the Army in India, he realised he was treating Indians badly and felt he was behaving like the Christian Brothers in Letterfrack. He was captured during World War II and held in a German prisoner-of-war camp where he felt treated better than in Letterfrack.

When he returned to England he fell victim to anti-Irish racism, but was also rejected in the Irish community there because of his outspoken views.

For about a decade Peter Tyrrell had corresponded with Senator Owen Sheehy-Skeffington. Through Sheehy-Skeffington, he was put in touch with Hibernia (forerunner of The Phoenix) magazine correspondent Joy Rudd in 1964. Rudd co-wrote his account of events in Letterfrack in the June edition under the title Early Days in Letterfrack, but the story was ignored by mainstream media outlets. Tyrrell was introduced by Rudd to a group of writers called Tuairim, who accepted his account of brutality in Letterfrack as being truthful, but who did not include it in their reports on children's institutions in Ireland.

Death

Tyrrell's charred remains were found on Hampstead Heath, London in 1967. The only clue to his identity was a torn postcard addressed to Owen Sheehy-Skeffington. After several months, Scotland Yard were finally able to make a positive identification. The verdict following an inquest was death by suicide.

Ryan Report

The Commission to Inquire into Child Abuse published its findings in the 'Ryan Report' on 20 May 2009 into abuse in industrial schools in Republic of Ireland. For legal reasons the Commission decided that names of victims and those complained of could not be made public and gave pseudonyms to both. Peter Tyrrell has been identified as "Noah Kitterick".

According to the Ryan Report, Noah Kitterick was in Letterfrack from 1924 to 1932. He wrote twice to the superior of Letterfrack in 1953 and met with the Superior General in 1957. He committed suicide by setting fire to himself in London in 1967.

Noah wrote to the Provincial of the Order in 1953, making allegations of sexual and physical abuse against three members of the order, identified in the report as "Br. Piperel", "Br. Perrin" and "Br. Corvax".

Noah wrote to the Superior twice in 1953, with two days between letters, but neither was replied to.

Noah met with the Provincial of the Congregation in 1957, though the latter thought he was "on a blackmail ticket".

Posthumous publication
His memoir, Founded in Fear, was finally published in 2006 by Irish Academic Press. The manuscript came to light in 2004 when historian Diarmuid Whelan was archiving the papers of Sheehy-Skeffington.

References

1916 births
1967 suicides
20th-century Irish male writers
People from County Galway
British Army personnel of World War II
British World War II prisoners of war
World War II prisoners of war held by Germany
Suicides by self-immolation
Suicides in Hampstead